Pinus contorta, with the common names lodgepole pine and shore pine, and also known as twisted pine, and contorta pine, is a common tree in western North America. It is common near the ocean shore and in dry montane forests to the subalpine, but is rare in lowland rain forests. Like all pines (member species of the genus Pinus), it is an evergreen conifer.

Description 
Depending on subspecies, Pinus contorta grows as an evergreen shrub or tree. The murrayana subspecies is the tallest. The crown is rounded and the top of the tree is flattened. In dense forests, the tree has a slim, conical crown. The formation of twin trees is common in some populations in British Columbia. The elastic branches stand upright or overhang and are difficult to break. The branches are covered with short shoots that are easy to remove.

The species name is contorta because of the twisted, bent pines found at coastal areas (shore pine) and the tree's twisted needles. Pinus contorta is occasionally known under several English names: black pine, scrub pine, and coast pine. P. contorta subsp. latifolia will hybridise with the closely related jack pine (P. banksiana).

The bark of lodgepole pine is thin, scaly and grayish brown. Shore pine bark is somewhat thick and corky, fissuring into a checkered pattern. Some lodgepole pines have been reported in low elevations with features closer to those of the shore pine, including the bark.

Tamarack pine can grow up to centuries old and lodgepole pines in Yellowstone Park have survived over 300 years.

Foliage 

They are short pointed, slightly rotated, and very resinous. Spring growth starts in beginning of April and the annual growth is completed by early July. The needle edge is weakly to strongly serrated. The needles are in pairs on short shoots and rotated about the shoots' longitudinal axes. In Alberta above , 1 to 5 needles occur per short shoot. A population with a high proportion of three-needled short shoots occurs in the Yukon. Needles live an average of four to six years, with a maximum of 13 years. The foliage of lodgepole pine is yellow-green as compared to shore pine, which is dark green.

Cones 
The cones of lodgepole and shore pine begin to be produced when the trees are about ten years old.

Many populations of the Rocky Mountain subspecies, P. contorta subsp. latifolia, have serotinous cones. This means that the cones are closed and must be exposed to high temperatures, such as from forest fires, in order to open and release their seeds. The variation in their serotiny has been correlated with wildfires and mountain pine beetle attacks. The cones of the coastal Pacific subspecies, P. contorta subsp. contorta, are typically non-serotinous, and those of the inland Pacific subspecies, P. contorta subsp. murrayana, are completely non-serotinous.

Distribution 
Pinus contorta occurs from upper, dry montane forests to the subalpine region of western North America. It can be found on the western side of the Cascades, in inland British Columbia, and on the Rocky Mountains in Alberta, except where it is too high and dry. Lodgepole pine can tolerate relatively hostile environments such as high-elevation volcanic rock in Central Oregon (e.g. Crater Lake) and thin soils on the eastern slope of the Cascades. It is rare in lowland rain forests. Shore pine can be found in very infertile soils in coastal regions from Southeast Alaska to Northern California.

Lodgepole and shore pine can be found intermingled (and apparently hybridized) north of Puget Sound. Less dependent on fire, tamarack pine can be found in California's upper mountains and mingled with lodgepole in Oregon. Pinus contorta can be found in the closed-cone pine forest of coastal California.

Ecology 
Pinus contorta is a fire-dependent species, requiring wildfires to maintain healthy populations of diverse ages. The thin bark of the lodgepole pine minimizes its defense to fire, although the heat of fire opens the cones to release the seeds. This allows the species to regenerate and maintain its place in the forest habitat. It otherwise fares poorly in crowds as other species are more shade tolerant, although some (e.g. firs) are more susceptible to fire.

The natural fire regime for this species is primarily driven by climate. The fires occur most often after years of drought. Forests in the upper montane to subalpine region experience much moisture in the winter via snow. The density of tree stands with the species inhibit the establishment of an understory (allowing ladder fuel to form), and surface fire is rare regardless. Thus, infrequent but severe fires dominate this species.

An example of the climate that plays a huge role in the fire regime of the species is quite complex. There are three different oscillations that play a major role in droughts. These are the Pacific decadal oscillation (PDO), Atlantic multidecadal oscillation (AMO) and El Niño (ENSO). A combination of these oscillations being in effect (+) or not in effect (−) have a global effect on the water available to these forests. The combination of AMO +, ENSO − and PDO − means there is going to be a drought and likely a severe subalpine fire.

Suillus tomentosus, a fungus, produces specialized structures called tuberculate ectomycorrhizae with the roots of lodgepole pine (Pinus contorta var. latifolia). These structures have been shown to be the location of concentrations of nitrogen-fixing bacteria which contribute a significant amount of nitrogen to tree growth and allow the pines to colonize nutrient-poor sites.

Porcupines consume the inner bark of lodgepole pine.

Threats 
Larger members of the species are attacked by mountain pine beetles, which it fights with pitch but can be overwhelmed. It is also affected by blue stain fungus (Grosmannia clavigera), which the mountain pine beetle carries in its mouth. Dwarf mistletoe also leeches off the species. Both the threat of pine beetles and dwarf mistletoe are curbed by wildfires, which occurred less in the 20th century due to firefighting. More recently, unthreatening lightning-sparked fires have been allowed to burn in wilderness areas in Idaho and Montana. Exceptional cold can kill some of the beetles.

A study released in 2011 concluded that Pinus contorta could experience significant reductions in distribution due to climate change by the late 21st century.

As an invasive species 
Pinus contorta is considered a serious invasive species of wilding conifer in New Zealand, along with several other western North American pine species. It is listed on the National Pest Plant Accord and is prohibited from sale, commercial propagation, and distribution.

Subspecies 
There are four subspecies of Pinus contorta, and one of them is sometimes considered to have two varieties. The subspecies are sometimes treated at the rank of variety.

Uses

Construction 
The common name "lodgepole pine" comes from the custom of Native Americans using the tall, straight trees to construct lodges (tepees) in the Rocky Mountain area. Lodgepole pine was used by European settlers to build log cabins. Logs are still used in rural areas as posts, fences, lumber, and firewood. Shore pine pitch has historically been used as glue.

Tree plantations of Pinus contorta have been planted extensively in Norway, Sweden, Ireland and the UK for forestry, such as timber uses. In Iceland it is used for reforestation and afforestation purposes. It is also commonly used for pressure-treated lumber throughout North America.

Food 
Native Americans consumed the inner bark of lodgepole pine to prevent starvation for themselves and their horses.

Medicinal 
The indigenous peoples of the Pacific Northwest and of California used different parts of the plant internally and externally as a traditional medicine for various ailments. The gum of shore pine was used medicinally as well as for chewing.

Cultivation 
Pinus contorta is cultivated as an ornamental tree by the horticulture industry. Plant nurseries grow Pinus contorta subsp. contorta and Pinus contorta subsp. murrayana for use in traditional and wildlife gardens, and as smaller selections of the native plant for natural landscaping. The shore pine's smaller varieties and cultivars are also used in container gardening, including as large bonsai specimens.

Cultivars of this species include:
 "Chief Joseph", a dwarf variety of Pinus contorta var. latifolia grown for its yellow winter needles
 "Spaan's Dwarf", a dwarf variety of Pinus contorta var. contorta that grows wider than it grows tall

The cultivar "Chief Joseph" has gained the Royal Horticultural Society's Award of Garden Merit.

Emblem 
Lodgepole pine is the provincial tree of Alberta, Canada.

References

External links 

 
 University of Wisconsin: Lodgepole forest webpage
 Virginia Tech dendrology website: Pinus contorta
 Guardian (U.K.) article: "Plague of beetles raises climate change fears for American beauty"
 Picea sitchensis – information, genetic conservation units and related resources. European Forest Genetic Resources Programme (EUFORGEN)
 
 
 

Flora of California
Flora of the Rocky Mountains
Flora of the Sierra Nevada (United States)
Garden plants of North America
Least concern flora of the United States
Least concern plants
Ornamental trees
contorta
Plants used in traditional Native American medicine
Provincial symbols of Alberta
Trees of Baja California
Trees of mild maritime climate
Trees of the Northwestern United States
Trees of the Southwestern United States
Trees of the West Coast of the United States
Trees of Western Canada